Harlington, Harmondsworth and Cranford Cottage Hospital was established in 1884 and opened in 1885.

History
The cottage hospital, which was halfway between Harmondsworth and Cranford on the Sipson Road, about four furlongs west of Harlington in western Middlesex, opened in 1884. The earliest contributors were W. Fane De Salis and John Derby Allcroft, who produced the £428 needed for the site; the Honourble. Lady Cowell Stepney £100; Mrs. Fane De Salis £50; Mr. Goodbun £50. After patients were transferred to local general hospitals, it closed in 1977.

References

External 
Harlington, Harmondsworth and Cranford Cottage Hospital Lost Hospitals of London

Hospital buildings completed in 1885
1884 establishments in England
Hospitals established in 1884
Buildings and structures in the London Borough of Hillingdon
Defunct hospitals in London
Cottage hospitals
Hospitals in Middlesex